Uncial 0267 (in the Gregory-Aland numbering), is a Greek uncial manuscript of the New Testament. Palaeographically it has been assigned to the 5th century.

Description 
The codex contains a small part of the Gospel of Luke 8:25-27, on 1 parchment leaf (7 cm by 9.5 cm). Probably it was written in one column per page, 10 lines per page, in uncial letters.

Currently it is dated by the INTF to the 5th century.

Text 
The text of this codex is too brief to determine its textual character. Aland did not place it in any of Categories of New Testament manuscripts. It was examined by Ramón Roca-Puig, who published its text in 1965.

Location 
Currently the codex is housed at the Santa Maria de Montserrat (P. Monts. Roca inv. 16) in Catalonia. It was formerly held at the Fundación Sant Lluc Evangelista (Pap. Barcinonensis, inv. n. 16) in Barcelona.

See also 

 List of New Testament uncials
 Textual criticism

References

Further reading 

 R. Roca-Puig, "Un pergamini grec de l'Evangeli de Sant Lluc", in: Miscel-lània Carles Cardó 30 (Barcelona, 1963), pp. 395-399.
 R. Roca-Puig, "Dos fragmentos biblicos de la colección Papyri Barcinonensis", Helmantica: Revista de filología clásica y hebrea 16 (Salamanca, 1965), pp. 139-149.

Greek New Testament uncials
5th-century biblical manuscripts